The Yale romanization of Korean was developed by Samuel Elmo Martin and his colleagues at Yale University about half a decade after McCune–Reischauer. It is the standard romanization of the Korean language in linguistics. 

The Yale system places primary emphasis on showing a word's morphophonemic structure. This distinguishes it from the other two widely used systems for romanizing Korean, the Revised Romanization of Korean (RR) and McCune–Reischauer. These two usually provide the pronunciation for an entire word, but the morphophonemic elements accounting for that pronunciation often cannot be recovered from the romanizations, which makes them ill-suited for linguistic use. In terms of morphophonemic content, the Yale system's approach can be compared to North Korea's former New Korean Orthography.

The Yale system tries to use a single consistent spelling for each morphophonemic element irrespective of its context. But Yale and Hangul differ in how back vowels are handled. 

Yale may be used for both modern Korean and Middle Korean. There are separate rules for Middle Korean. Martin's 1992 Reference Grammar of Korean uses italics for Middle Korean as well as other texts predating the 1933 abandonment of arae a, whereas it shows current language in boldface.

Vowels
Yale writes basic vowels as a, e, o, and u. Vowels written to the right in Hangul are written as a or e, and vowels that are written below are o or u. Yale indicates fronting of a vowel (Middle Korean diphthongs), written in Hangul as an additional i , with a final -y. Palatalization is shown by a medial -y-.

Although Hangul treats the rounded back vowels of Middle Korean as simple vowels, Yale writes them as a basic vowel, combined with a medial -w-.

1. Thus, it is important to consider the time period in question when the romanization is interpreted.
2. Thus, there is no one-to-one correspondence in the spelling of back vowels.

Consonants
Yale uses unvoiced consonant letters to write Modern Korean consonants. Middle Korean  (bansiot) is written as z. Tense consonants and consonant clusters are transcribed according to the Hangul spelling. Aspirated consonants are written as if they were clusters ending in h.

Other symbols
The letter q indicates reinforcement which is not shown in hangul spelling:
  halq il //
  halq kes //
  kulqca //

A period indicates the orthographic syllable boundary in cases of letter combinations that would otherwise be ambiguous. It is also used for other purposes such as to indicate sound change:
  nulk.un "old"
  kath.i /kachi/ "together"; "like", "as" etc.

A macron over a vowel letter indicate that in old or dialectal language, this vowel is pronounced long:
  māl "word(s)"
  mal "horse(s)"

Accents marks are used instead of or in addition to the macron when recording dialects, such as Gyeongsang or Hamgyeong, which have retained tones.
Note: Vowel length (or pitch, depending on the dialect) as a distinctive feature seems to have disappeared at least among younger speakers of the Seoul dialect sometime in the late 20th century.

A superscript letter indicates consonants that have disappeared from a word's South Korean orthography and standard pronunciation. For example, the South Korean orthographic syllable  (RR yeong) is romanized as follows:
 yeng where no initial consonant has been dropped.Example:  yeng.e
 lyeng where an initial l () has been dropped or changed to n () in the South Korean standard language.Examples:  lyengto;  lNo Muhyen
 nyeng where an initial n () has been dropped in the South Korean standard language.Example:  nYengpyen

The indication of vowel length or pitch and disappeared consonants often make it easier to predict how a word is pronounced in Korean dialects when given its Yale romanization compared to its South Korean hangul spelling.

High levels of analysis

At higher levels of morphological abstraction, superscript and subscript vowel symbols joined by a slash may be used to indicate alternations due to vowel harmony. If used for modern day language, this just means the symbol , though Middle Korean also had the vowel alternation . 

An apostrophe may be used for vowel elision or crasis. 
  =  na 'y = nay "my"
  =  pyel 'lo = pyel lo "especially"

Special letters may be used to indicate final consonants in stem changing verbs.
  keTta "to walk" (dictionary citation form)
  keT yo "he walks" (conjugated form)

See also 
 Yale romanization of Cantonese
 Yale romanization of Mandarin

References

 
 

Romanization of Korean